The Royal Automobile Club of Western Australia (RAC WA) is a motoring club and mutual organisation, offering motoring services and advice, insurance, travel services, finance, driver training and exclusive benefits for their members. As an independent voice for road users in WA, RAC is concerned with all aspects of road and community safety.

History

1905: The Automobile Club of WA starts signposting roads and creating maps of the state for motorists and the Club encourages local authorities to improve road surfaces and push for lower city-driving speeds.

Services

Roadside assistance – breakdown assistance
Finance – car, personal and travel loans
Insurance – home, contents, car, motorcycle, caravan, boat, landlords, renters
Home security – home security systems
Tourism and travel – escorted and unescorted tours, accommodation bookings
Auto services - vehicle repair and service centres
Member service centres – a network of retail outlets providing RAC Travel products and other merchandise
Parks and resorts - a network of holiday resorts (chalets, caravan and camping sites) in Western Australia
RAC Intellibus - Autonomous bus being trialled in South Perth

Advocacy

The RAC is an important advocate for its members and the WA community on issues such as road and vehicle safety, fuel pricing, road funding, transport planning, energy and the environment.

Corporate

The RAC headquarters is located at 832 Wellington Street, West Perth, Western Australia.  On the Wellington Street frontage a number of floor paving tiles recognise the contribution of notable Western Australians to the RAC and motoring in Western Australia.

The RAC Group comprises the Royal Automotive Club of WA (Incorporated), RAC Insurance Pty Limited, RAC Travel Services Pty Ltd, RAC Finance Ltd and RAC Security Services Pty Ltd.

References

External links

 http://www.rac.com.au
 RAC Milestones over the years 

Clubs and societies in Western Australia
Transport in Western Australia
Automobile Club of Western Australia, Royal
1905 establishments in Australia
Non-profit organisations based in Western Australia
Automobile associations in Australia
Emergency road services